Tatria minor is an endoparasitic tapeworm which infects grebes in the Palaearctic. It is common in the horned grebe in Lake Mývatn, Iceland.

References 

Eucestoda
Parasites of birds
Animals described in 1904